Four! is a 1958 album by Hampton Hawes, originally released on the Contemporary label and reissued in 1991 by Original Jazz Classics.

Reception

AllMusic's Scott Yanow gives the album five stars and states that "Pianist Hampton Hawes' 1950s recordings for the Contemporary label are at such a high level that they could all be given five stars. This outing with bassist Red Mitchell, drummer Shelly Manne, and guitarist Barney Kessel (who is a slight wild card) is also quite successful." The Penguin Guide to Jazz rates the album three and a half stars and states that "Hampton was always trying to broker a style which combined the strengths of old and new, and this was one of the places where the synthesis worked and showed the joins."

Track listing
 "Yardbird Suite" (Parker) - 6:40
 "There Will Never Be Another You" (Gordon, Warren) - 6:59
 "Bow Jest" (Mitchell) - 6:31
 "Sweet Sue" (Young, Harris) - 5:35
 "Up Blues" (Hawes) - 5:09
 "Like Someone in Love" (Burke, Van Heusen) - 3:21
 "Love Is Just Around the Corner" (Gensler, Robin) - 5:42
 "Thou Swell" (Hart, Rodgers) - 4:54  (CD reissue bonus track)
 "The Awful Truth" (Hawes) - 8:09  (CD reissue bonus track)

Personnel 
 Hampton Hawes - piano
 Barney Kessel - guitar
 Red Mitchell - double bass
 Shelly Manne - drums

See also
 Hampton Hawes discography

References

1958 albums
Contemporary Records albums
Original Jazz Classics albums
Hampton Hawes albums